This is a list of rivers of Bosnia and Herzegovina ordered alphabetically.

Draining into the Black Sea 
 Glina (right tributary to Kupa)
 Glinica (right tributary)
 Bojna
 Bužimica
 Kladušnica (right tributary in Velika Kladuša)
 Korana (right tributary to Kupa)
 Mutnica (Korana) (right tributary)
 Sava (right tributary of the Danube)
 Bosna (right tributary)
 Babina rijeka (right tributary near/in Zenica)
 Fojnička rijeka (left tributary)
 Lepenica (Fojnička rijeka) (left tributary)
 Bijela rijeka (Lepenica) (right tributary near Kreševo)
 Crna rijeka (Lepenica) (right tributary near Kreševo)
 Kreševka (right tributary in Kreševo)
 Željeznica (Fojnička rijeka) (right tributary)
 Dragača (left tributary in Fojnica)
 Goruša (right tributary in Visoko)
 Krivaja (right tributary in Zavidovići)
 Stupčanica (source of the Krivaja (in confluence with the Bioštica) and right tributary in Olovo)
 Bioštica (source of the Krivaja (in confluence with the Stupčanica) and left tributary in Olovo)
 Kaljina (left tributary)
 Orlja (left tributary)
 Tribija (left tributary)
 Vijaka (left tributary)
 Duboštica (left tributary)
 Župeljeva (right tributary)
 Mala Maoča (left tributary)
 Velika Maoča (right tributary)
 Lašva (left tributary)
 Bila (left tributary)
 Grlovnica (right tributary)
 Komašnica (right tributary near Travnik)
 Kruščica (right tributary)
 Ljubina (Bosna) (right tributary in Semizovac)
 Miljacka (right tributary)
 Mokranjska Miljacka (right tributary)
 Koševski Potok (right tributary)
 Paljanska Miljacka (left tributary)
 Bistrica (Paljanska Miljacka) (left tributary)
 Misoča (right tributary)
 Blaža (left tributary)
 Ribnica (right tributary near Kakanj)
 Mala rijeka (Ribnica) (left tributary near Kakanj)
 Stavnja (left tributary in Ilijaš)
 Mala rijeka (Stavnja) (left tributary)
 Trstionica (right tributary near Kakanj)
 Bukovica (Trstionica) (left tributary near Kraljeva Sutjeska)
 Usora (left tributary south of Doboj)
 Mala Usora
 Velika Usora
 Željeznica (right tributary)
Crna rijeka (Bosna)
 Kasindolska (right tributary)
 Brka (right tributary in Brčko)
 Dašnica (right tributary in Semberija)
 Drina (right tributary)
 Piva (source of the Drina (in confluence with Tara) and left tributary)
 Tara (source of the Drina (in confluence with Piva) and right tributary)
 Ćehotina (right tributary)
 Bistrica (Drina) (left tributary)
 Govza (right tributary)
 Prača (left tributary)
 Rakitnica (Prača) (left tributary)
 Drinjača (left tributary)
 Jadar (right tributary)
 Kravica (right tributary)
 Janja (left tributary in Semberija)
 Janjina (right tributary)
 Kolina (left tributary)
 Lim (right tributary)
 Rzav (right tributary in Višegrad)
 Beli Rzav
 Crni Rzav
 Sutjeska (left tributary south from Foča)
 Hrčavka (left tributary)
 Jablanica (right tributary near Bosanska Gradiška)
 Bukovica (Jablanica) (right tributary)
 Ljubina (Jablanica) (right tributary)
 Jurkovica (right tributary near Bosanska Gradiška)
 Lukavac (right tributary in Semberija)
 Ljubija (left tributary)
 Ukrina (right tributary near Bosanski Brod)
 Ilova (right tributary)
 Mala Ukrina
 Velika Ukrina
 Una (right tributary)
 Srebrenica (right tributary)
 Krka (right tributary)
 Unac (right tributary)
 Čava (right tributary)
 Klokot (left tributary)
 Krušnica (right tributary in Bosanska Krupa)
 Mlječanica (right tributary)
 Knežica (left tributary)
 Sana (right tributary)
 Blija (left tributary in Sanski Most)
 Dabar (left tributary south from Sanski Most)
 Gomjenica (right tributary near Prijedor)
 Bistrica (Gomjenica) (right tributary)
 Krivaja (Gomjenica) (right tributary)
 Japra (left tributary near Bosanski Novi)
 Japrica (left tributary)
 Kijevska rijeka (right tributary)
 Kozica (right tributary)
 Jovica (right tributary)
 Strigova (right tributary)
 Kriva rijeka (right tributary)
 Mekinja (left tributary)
 Vrbas (right tributary)
 Bistrica (Vrbas) (right tributary near Gornji Vakuf)
 Mutnica (Bistrica) (left tributary)
 Bunta (left tributary between Gornji Vakuf and Bugojno)
 Crna rijeka (Vrbas) (left tributary in Mrkonjić Grad)
 Desna (left tributary before Gornji Vakuf)
 Dragočaj (left tributary north of Banja Luka)
 Duboka (left tributary in Bugojno)
 Pliva (right tributary in Jajce)
 Janj (right tributary)
 Kupreška rijeka (right tributary)
 Ugar (right tributary downflow of Jajce)
Ilomska (right tributary downflow of Vitovlje), Travnik
 Crna rijeka (Ilomska) (left tributary below Petrovo polje)
 Mala Ilomska (right tributary below Petrovo Polje)
 Manatovac (right tributary on Vlašić slopes)
 Kobilja (right tributary below Imljani), downflow from mouth of Ilomska
 Pljačkovac (right tributary nearby Vitovlje), Travnik
 Vrbanja (right tributary in Banja Luka)
 Bobovica (right tributary in Kruševo Brdo)
 Bosanka (right tributary in Vrbanjci)
 Crkvenica (right tributary in Šiprage)
 Cvrcka (left tributary nearby Vrbanjci)
 Čudnić (left tributary in Kruševo Brdo)
 Ćorkovac (left tributary in Šiprage)
 Demićka (left tributary in Šiprage)
 Duboka (left tributary near Grabovica)
 Grabovička rijeka (left tributary in Grabovica), Kotor Varoš
 Jakotina (left tributary in Kotor Varoš)
 Jezerka (right tributary nearby Vrbanjci)
 Jošavka (right tributary in Čelinac)
 Kruševica (right tributary in Obodnik)
 Sadika (left tributary downflow from Šiprage)
 Vigošća/Vigošta (right tributary in Obodnik)
 Vrbaška (right tributary)
 Crna rijeka (Vrbaška) (left tributary)

Draining into the Adriatic Sea 
 Neretva
 Blučica (right tributary near Jablanica lake)
 Bregava (left tributary near Stolac and Čapljina)
 Trebižat (right tributary near Čapljina)
 Buna (left tributary near Buna)
 Bunica (left tributary)
 Doljanka (right tributary in Jablanica)
 Drežanka (right tributary)
 Jezernica (right tributary)
 Kraljuščica (right tributary)
 Neretvica (right tributary near Konjic)

Draining into lakes 
 Mande, into Buško jezero

Disappearing rivers 
 Bijela (west side of Prenj mountain)
 Plovuča (in Livno field)
 Bistrica (Livno) (in Livno field)
Sturba
 Žabljak (in Livno field)
 Drina (Duvno field) (in Duvno field)
 Jaruga (in Livno field)
 Jaruga (in Glamoč field)
 Lištica (near Široki Brijeg)
 Milač (in Kupres field)
 Mrtvica (in Kupres field)
 Mušnica (in Gatačko field)
 Vrljika (in Imotski field)
 Matica (left tributary)

References 

Bosnia and Herzegovina
Rivers